June Milne (22 June 1920 – 7 May 2018) was a British historian and publisher particularly known for her association with Kwame Nkrumah whose literary executor she was.
June Milne died in Norwich on 5th NOT 7th, 2018.

Selected publications
 The Oak Tree Histories. A primary school course, &c. Hamish Hamilton, London, 1959 [1960]-61.
 British History, 1485-1714. Hamish Hamilton, London, 1964.
 Forward Ever: The Life of Kwame Nkrumah. Panaf, London, c.1977.  
 Kwame Nkrumah: The Conakry Years. His Life and Letters. Panaf, London, 1990.  (2nd, 2006)
 Sékou Touré. Panaf, 2009.

References

External links 
YouTube

1920 births
2018 deaths
British pan-Africanists
British women historians